Vincenzo "Enzo" Cannavale (5 April 1928 – 18 March 2011) was an Italian film actor. He appeared in more than 100 films since 1949, including Cinema Paradiso, which won the Academy Award for Best Foreign Language Film at the 62nd Academy Awards in 1990. He was awarded the Nastro d’Argento for Best Supporting Actor in 32 dicembre (December 32nd) by Luciano De Crescenzo.

Selected filmography

 Yvonne la Nuit (1949) - Il maggiordomo (uncredited)
 Sogno di una notte di mezza sbornia (1959) - Fish-monger
 Leoni al sole (1961) - Il commissario
 The Four Days of Naples (1962) - Partigiano (uncredited)
 Treasure of San Gennaro (1966) - Gaetano
 More Than a Miracle (1967)
 Stasera mi butto (1967) - Waiter
 Chimera (1968) - Porter in Capocabana Hotel
 Operazione ricchezza (1968)
 Zum zum zum - La canzone che mi passa per la testa (1969) - Filippo - Brother of Tosca
 Zum zum zum n° 2 (1969) - Valerio
 Il suo nome è Donna Rosa (1969) - Gennarino
 Mezzanotte d'amore (1970) - Gennarino
 Cose di Cosa Nostra (1971) - Priest
 Between Miracles (1971) - Paziente 'sano' della clinica
 Faccia da schiaffi (1971)
 Il furto è l'anima del commercio!?... (1971) - Mortaretto
 Roma Bene (1971) - Tognon
 Trastevere (1971) - Straccaletto
 White Sister (1972) - Quinto
 Gang War in Naples (1972) - Nicola Cafiero - 'Sciancato'
 Alfredo, Alfredo (1972) - Alfredo's Lawyer
 The Adventures of Pinocchio (1972, TV Mini-Series) - Oste
 Flatfoot (1973) - Deputy Inspector Caputo
 Sgarro alla camorra (1973) - Vincenzo
 Poker in Bed (1974) - Peppino
 Il domestico (1974) - Salvatore Sperato
 Il trafficone (1974) - Gennarino
 Professore venga accompagnato dai suoi genitori (1974) - School caretaker
 Flatfoot in Hong Kong (1975) - Inspector Caputo
 The School Teacher (1975) - Peppino
 Vergine e di nome Maria (1975) - Simone
 Teasers (1975) - Osvaldo
 Eye of the Cat (1975) - Lolò
 Quel movimento che mi piace tanto (1976) - Salvatore Siniscalchi
 Soldier of Fortune (1976) - Bracalone da Napoli
 La segretaria privata di mio padre (1976) - Giuseppe
 Taxi Girl (1977) - Commissario Angelini
 A Man Called Magnum (1977) - Sergeant Nicola Capece
 Orazi e curiazi 3-2 (1977) - Sempronio
 Cara sposa (1977) - Salomone
 Flatfoot in Africa (1978) - Caputo
 Little Italy (1978) - Salvatore
 How to Lose a Wife and Find a Lover (1978) - The Guru
 L'inquilina del piano di sopra (1978) - Gennaro
 Gegè Bellavita (1978) - Gennarino's Friend
 L'anello matrimoniale (1979) - Ernesto
 The Gang That Sold America (1979) - Salvatore Esposito
 The Face with Two Left Feet (1979) - Caruso
 Liquirizia (1979) - Custode
 The Finzi Detective Agency (1979) - Giuseppe Marchini
 L'imbranato (1979)
 L'affittacamere (1979) - Pasquale Esposito
 Flatfoot in Egypt (1980) - Maresc. Caputo
 Love in First Class (1980) - Il reverendo
 Savage Breed (1980) - Don Peppino
 La settimana bianca (1980) - Enzo
 Il casinista (1980) - Don Totò
 L'amante tutta da scoprire (1981) - Gaetano
 La settimana al mare (1981) - Antonio Martinelli
 Per favore, occupati di Amelia (1981) - Padre adottivo di Amelia
 Una vacanza del cactus (1981) - Giuseppe Zerboni
 Chaste and Pure (1981) - Don Bottazzi
 Crime at the Chinese Restaurant (1981) - Vincenzo
 Il marito in vacanza (1981) - Vinicio
 Il paramedico (1982) - Generoso Gallina-The lawyer
 Il sommergibile più pazzo del mondo (1982) - Il Ladro
 Sturmtruppen 2 (tutti al fronte) (1982)
 La sai l'ultima sui matti? (1982) - Babà
 Giuramento (1982) - Raffaele
 È forte un casino! (1982) - Michele
 Un jeans e una maglietta (1983)
 Sfrattato cerca casa equo canone (1983) - Gildo
 La discoteca (1983) - Hotel Director
 Il tifoso, l'arbitro e il calciatore (1984) - Sposito
 Il ragazzo di campagna (1984) - Blind man
 My Friends Act III (1985) - Cavalier Ferrini
 Vacanze d'estate (1985) - Commendator Turati
 Il coraggio di parlare (1987) - Vincenzino's father
 Le vie del Signore sono finite (1987) - Il padre di Camillo
 32 December (1988) - Alfonso Caputo (segment "I penultimi fuochi")
  (1988) - Paolo, italian beach observer
 Cinema Paradiso (1988) - Spaccafico
 What if Gargiulo Finds Out? (1988) - Padre di Teresa
 Sabato, domenica e lunedì (1990) - Don Antonio
 Le comiche (1990) - Il prete
 The House of Smiles (1991) - Avvocato
 Pacco, doppio pacco e contropaccotto (1993) - Il portiere della bisca clandestina
 Condannato a nozze (1993) - Ivano
 Amore a prima vista (1999) - Il cannibale
 L'uomo della fortuna (2000) - Armandino
 Our Tropical Island (2001) - Sciallero
 Ho visto le stelle (2003) - Prete
 I mostri oggi (2009) - Nonno di Alessia

References

External links

1928 births
2011 deaths
Italian male film actors
Male actors from Naples
Nastro d'Argento winners
20th-century Italian male actors
Italian male stage actors
Italian male television actors